Trachysmatis is a genus of moths of the family Erebidae. The genus was described by Schaus in 1916.

Species
Trachysmatis ignobilis Schaus, 1916 Panama
Trachysmatis mogia Schaus, 1916 French Guiana

References

Herminiinae